Michael Chetwynd Slamer is a British guitarist.

Biography
Slamer started his career playing in the UK prog-rock band City Boy. Since then, he has worked as a staff composer for various movies and TV series, has been a session guitarist for numerous recording artists, and played in several bands.  He provided the guitar solos on Warrant's first two albums, Dirty Rotten Filthy Stinking Rich and Cherry Pie. He also contributed two solos on a Kix record. The songs were “Scarlet Fever” and “Walking Away.”

He at different times cooperated with two members of the progressive rock band Kansas. With Steve Walsh he formed Streets, and with Billy Greer he created the band Seventh Key. Streets released two albums on the Atlantic label, 1st (1983) and Crimes in Mind (1985).  A live Streets album was released on the BMG label in 1997 and features a concert for the King Biscuit Flower Hour radio show from 1983. Slamer was also credited as a co-writer for the Kansas song "Refugee" from The Prelude Implicit (2016).

Slamer has also released two albums with the group Steelhouse Lane, plus a solo album entitled Nowhere Land, with former Strangeways member Terry Brock on vocals (2006).

Slamer released an album entitled Devil's Hand with Last in Line vocalist Andrew Freeman (December 2018).

Discography

with City Boy
1976: City Boy
1977: Dinner at the Ritz
1977: Young Men Gone West
1978: Book Early
1979: The Day the Earth Caught Fire
1980: Heads Are Rolling
1981: It's Personal
2001: Anthology (compilation)

with Streets
1983: 1st
1985: Crimes in Mind
1997: King Biscuit Flower Hour Presents Streets or Live-Shakedown

with Steelhouse Lane
1998: Metallic Blue (Avex Trax) (guitar)
1999: Slaves of the New World (Escape Music Ltd.) (producer, guitar)

Chris Thompson and Mike Slamer
2001: Won't Lie Down (CD) (guitar)

with Seventh Key
2001: Seventh Key (with Billy Greer) (CD) (producer, guitar)
2004: The Raging Fire (with Billy Greer) (CD)
2005: Seventh Key Live in Atlanta (with Billy Greer) (CD and DVD)
2013: I Will Survive (with Billy Greer) (CD)

with Devil's Hand
2018: Devil's Hand (with Andrew Freeman) (CD) (producer, guitar)

Album credits
Kix
1985: Midnite Dynamite (guitar)
Angry Anderson
1990: Blood from Stone (CD) (guitar)
Steve Walsh
2000: Glossolalia (CD) (guitar)
Terry Brock
2010: Diamond Blue (CD) (producer, guitar)

As solo artist (Slamer)
2006: Nowhere Land (Frontiers Records)

References

External links
 Official website
 Myspace profile for Mike Slamer
 Radio interview with Mike Slamer about his time with City Boy (August 2006)
 "Nowhere Land – Slamer"

English rock guitarists
English session musicians
English film score composers
English male film score composers
Year of birth missing (living people)
Living people
English male guitarists